Rajasthan State Open School was mainly founded in 2005. The main reason for establishing this is to educate the poor students, in which the student can choose the subjects according to his choice 

RSOS includes students mainly in the secondary and upper secondary classes.  It takes a few days of classes in which the student has taught the selected subjects.

This open board is recognized by various institutions across the country.  Its chart can be used in railway, army, higher studies. Rajasthani language was added to in the past years.  This board conducts examinations twice a year, it can include students of any age.

References 

Government schools in India
Schools in Rajasthan